UglyDolls is a 2019 computer-animated musical adventure-comedy film directed by Kelly Asbury and written by Alison Peck, from a story by Robert Rodriguez, who also produced. It is based on the plush toys of the same name by David Horvath and Sun-Min Kim, who were the original producers of this movie, and follows a group of them as they try to find owners in the "Big World" despite their flaws. The film stars the voices of Kelly Clarkson, Janelle Monáe, Nick Jonas, Pitbull, Blake Shelton, Wanda Sykes, Gabriel Iglesias, Wang Leehom, Emma Roberts, Bebe Rexha, Charli XCX, and Lizzo. 

UglyDolls was theatrically released by STX Films, the first animated film produced by the company. It received negative reviews from critics and grossed $32 million worldwide, and was the last film directed by Kelly Asbury, who died in June 2020 from cancer.

Plot

In a hidden universe within a toy factory, deformed dolls, or Uglies/UglyDolls, are dropped into a tunnel leading to the secluded town of Uglyville. Among these dolls is Moxy, who dreams of the 'Big World' and being loved by a child, despite Uglyville's Mayor Ox assuring her this concept is a myth. One day, Moxy enters the tunnel to find her way to the Big World, followed by the town's cynical chef Wage, easy-going Ugly Dog, shy wiseman Lucky Bat, and soft-hearted giant Babo.

The UglyDolls discover the Institute of Perfection, where Perfect Dolls (or "Pretties") are rigorously trained. The vain and superficial leader of the institute, Lou, tells Moxy and her friends that they cannot hope to pass the training for the Gauntlet - an obstacle course based on a human house, which determines if a doll will be allowed to use the portal to the Big World. Faced with Moxy's positivity, Lou relents and lets them train; however, he sends his three Spy Girls to find out where Moxy's group came from.

The Uglydolls's first days of training end in disaster. Mandy, one of the Pretties, sympathizes with them, as she has poor eyesight but can't wear glasses for fear of being labeled 'ugly' and put in the dreaded recycling center. She gives them some pointers, and helps them dress the part of a 'perfect doll'.

The Spy Girls return with a kidnapped Ox, and Lou makes him admit to Moxy he actually knew about the Big World, as he had once trained with Lou for the Gauntlet and nearly passed. However, the Pretties turned on Ox, and Lou sent him down the tunnel, claiming he thought it led to safety. Ox found the recycling center there; seeing other dolls like himself being shredded up, he rerouted the tunnel and founded Uglyville at the other end.

Demoralized by the realization they are factory rejects, the entire town of Uglyville falls into despair, and Moxy resigns herself to her fate. Mandy visits and encourages Moxy to keep her faith, as it has given all the imperfect Pretties hope that they might succeed. Moxy and Mandy try to return to the Gauntlet, but are waylaid by Lou, who has unblocked the recycling center. He leaves Mandy and Moxy to be shredded, but Ox learns what has happened and rallies the Ugly Dolls to rescue the pair.

The entire population of Uglyville arrives at the Institute on the day of the Gauntlet. Moxy, Mandy, and several Uglies demand to be allowed to participate. Lou announces he and several others will run with them, secretly planning to sabotage the Uglies' chances. However, once in the Gauntlet, Lou shows his true colors as a coward, abandoning his comrades and leaving them to be saved by the Uglies.

Lou loses everyone's respect completely when he kicks a robot baby, making it cry. Moxy comforts the baby instead of finishing the course, prompting all but Lou to do the same. The system automatically passes them, since a Doll's true purpose is to make a child happy. Lou, however, is failed despite finishing the course, and is forced to admit he is only a prototype and forbidden to leave the factory. When he saw Ox nearly pass the training, he couldn't bear to see an Ugly go to the human world when he, supposedly perfection itself, could not. He sabotaged Ox so he'd hopefully be killed in the recycling center.

Seeing everyone has turned on him, Lou smashes the portal to the human world out of spite. The Pretties capture and put Lou in a washing machine as punishment, but the portal is irrevocably destroyed. The Uglies and Pretties work together to build a new, permanently-open portal that does not require any training to pass back and forth through. They combine their towns into the City of Imperfection, still led by Mayor Ox. Moxy finally passes through the portal and is placed in the arms of her perfect child, Maizy, who has the same missing tooth as Moxy does.

During the credits, it is shown that several Uglies and Pretties have found their perfect human, while a bedraggled Lou has been demoted to janitorial duty.

Cast
 Kelly Clarkson as Moxy, a pink uglydoll with lots of confidence, hope, and curiosity. Her design is based on that of Gorgeous, a character from the original toyline.
 Janelle Monáe as Mandy, a kindhearted perfect doll who wears glasses for eyesight problems and befriends the Ugly Dolls
 Blake Shelton as Ox, a green uglydoll and the Unofficial Mayor of Uglyville, mentor to all of the other Ugly Dolls and former friend of Lou
 Wanda Sykes as Wage, an orange uglydoll and cynical baker who can be frequently found cooking up some amazing and inventive culinary concoctions
 Gabriel Iglesias as Babo, a grey uglydoll and the largest of the uglydolls
 Wang Leehom as Lucky Bat, a red uglydoll and thoughtful but shy adviser
 Bebe Rexha as Tuesday, a blue-haired perfect doll and one of the Spy Girls
 Charli XCX as Kitty, a pink-haired perfect doll and one of the Spy Girls
 Lizzo as Lydia, a purple-haired perfect doll and one of the Spy Girls
 Nick Jonas as Lou, the preppy leader from the town of Perfection and a bully towards the Ugly Dolls and the other imperfect dolls
 Pitbull as Ugly Dog, a one-eyed blue uglydoll and Moxy's closest friend
 Pitbull reprises his role in the Spanish dub.
 Ice-T as Peggy, a small one-eyed flying unicorn
 Emma Roberts as Wedgehead, the newest citizen of Uglyville
 Kelly Asbury as Gibberish Cat, Oliver, Chef, Buttons; this was also Mr. Asbury's final voice role before his death in 2020.
 Jane Lynch as Scanner
 Natalie Martinez as Meghan, a lawyer and model
 Rob Riggle as Exposition Robot
 Afi Ekulona as Tray
 Jacques Colimon as Sporko

Production
In May 2011, it was announced that Illumination had acquired the rights to Uglydolls to make an animated feature film. Chris Meledandri was set to produce, with a screenplay from Larry Stuckey. The original creators, David Horvath and Sun-Min Kim, were set to executive produce. Four years later, in 2015, Variety magazine reported that an animated film based on Uglydolls would be the first project produced by STX Entertainment's new "family and animation" division. On March 28, 2017, Robert Rodriguez signed on to direct, write, and produce the film, with a release date set for May 10, 2019. Animation for the film was done at Reel FX Creative Studios.

In March 2018, it was announced that the voice of rapper Pitbull would be featured in the film for an unknown role, and he would also provide an original song for the film. In May 2018, it was announced that Kelly Asbury had signed on to direct the feature film. In July 2018, another singer Kelly Clarkson joined the voice cast of the film as the voice of Moxy, and would provide an original song for the film. In August 2018, Nick Jonas joined the voice cast of the film, and he would also perform an original song for the film. In September 2018, comedians Wanda Sykes and Gabriel Iglesias joined the film. On September 20, 2018, it was announced that country music singer Blake Shelton had joined the film, and would voice Ox, as well as performing original music. In October 2018, it was announced that Wang Leehom, Janelle Monáe and Emma Roberts had been cast in the film.

Music

The film features original music from Kelly Clarkson, Nick Jonas, Blake Shelton, Janelle Monáe, Bebe Rexha, Pentatonix, Anitta, and Why Don't We. The musical score is composed by Christopher Lennertz while songs are written by Lennertz and Glenn Slater. The film's soundtrack was released by Atlantic Records.

Clarkson's track "Broken & Beautiful" was released on March 27, 2019, prior to the album, as the soundtrack's lead single. The Brazilian singer Anitta contributed "Ugly" to the original soundtrack in English. She also recorded two alternative versions of "Ugly", one in Spanish and one in Portuguese, for their respective markets. These versions were released prior to the release of the film and are not included in the soundtrack in these markets.

Pitbull was also slated to have an original song for the film, which was to be a parody of "You Make My Dreams" by Daryl Hall and John Oates. However, Pitbull's contributions to the song were scrapped, as he broke the fourth wall as Uglydog. Pentatonix was then given the final version of the record, which was included in the movie's soundtrack. Pitbull's original version, titled "Dreams Come True", can be found on DJ record pools for promotional use.

Release
UglyDolls was initially scheduled to be released on May 10, 2019, but was later moved up a week to May 3 in order to avoid competition with Pokémon: Detective Pikachu.

The studio spent around $40 million on promotions and advertisements for the film.

Home media
UglyDolls was released on Digital HD on July 16, 2019, and on DVD and Blu-ray on July 30, 2019.

Additional media 
A video game tie-in for various platforms was produced by Outright Games titled Ugly Dolls: An Imperfect Adventure, with the initial retail price being $39.99 USD. A variety of merchandise, including plush toys, playsets, and blind bags, was released by Hasbro featuring several characters from the movie.

Reception

Box office
UglyDolls grossed $20.2 million in the United States and Canada, and $11.2 in other territories, for a worldwide total of $31.4 million.

In the United States and Canada, UglyDolls was released alongside The Intruder and Long Shot, and was projected to gross $12–14 million from 3,652 theaters in its opening weekend. The film made $2.5 million on its first day, including $300,000 from Thursday night previews. However, it underperformed in its first week, finishing fourth in box office receipts at only $8.6 million. The film fell 51.8% in its second weekend, grossing $4.1 million and finishing in seventh place.

Critical response
The website's critical consensus reads, "Very young viewers may be entertained by UglyDolls, if only because they're less likely to recognize the many familiar elements in its affirmative yet formulaic story." On Metacritic the film has a weighted average score of 39 out of 100, based on 20 critics, indicating "generally unfavorable reviews". Audiences polled by CinemaScore gave the film an average grade of "B+" on an A+ to F scale, while those at PostTrak gave it 2.5 out of 5 stars and a 51% "definite recommend".

Owen Gleiberman of Variety magazine was positive, saying that "the sincerity with which UglyDolls pits unblemished conformity against ungainly soul is touching—and, yes, instructive—in all the right ways." 
Jesse Hassenger of The A.V. Club gave the film a grade C− and wrote: "Like their Troll ancestors, the UglyDolls combine an evergreen cuteness with a why-now lack of currency."

Accolades
UglyDolls was awarded a ReFrame Stamp in the category "Top 100-Grossing Narrative Feature" for involving female-identifying people in at least four of eight key areas of production. The song "Broken & Beautiful" was nominated in the 2019 Teen Choice Awards in the category "Choice Song from a Movie".

References

External links

 
 

2019 computer-animated films
2019 comedy films
2019 films
2010s American animated films
2010s children's comedy films
2010s musical comedy films
American children's animated comedy films
American children's animated musical films
American computer-animated films
Canadian animated feature films
Canadian computer-animated films
Films about discrimination
Films about social class
Films about toys
Films based on toys
Films directed by Kelly Asbury
Films produced by Robert Rodriguez
Films scored by Christopher Lennertz
Films with screenplays by Robert Rodriguez
Reel FX Creative Studios films
Films about sentient toys
STX Entertainment films
2010s Canadian films